A number of units of measurement were used in Somalia to measure length, mass, area, capacity, etc.  Metric system adopted in 1950, and has been compulsory since 1972 in Somalia.

System before metric system

A number of units were used.  These units were local and varied with materials and provinces.

Length

Several units were used to measure length.  One top was equal to 3.92 m.  One cubito was equal to 1/7 top.

Mass

A number of units were used to measure mass.  One rottolo (pound) was equal to 0.448 kg.  Some other units are given below:

1 okia (ounce) =  rottolo

1 frasla = 36 rottolo

1 gisla = 360 rottolo.

Area

One darat was equal to 8000 m2.

Capacity

Two main systems, dry and liquid, were used.

Dry

Several units were used to measure dry capacity.  One chela was equal to 1.359 L.  Some other units were given below:

1 tabla = 15 chela

1 gisla = 120 chela.

Liquid

One caba was equal to 0.453 L.

References

Somali culture
Somalia